Buccinaria pendula is a species of sea snail, a marine gastropod mollusk in the family Raphitomidae.

Description
The length of the shell attains 8 mm.

Distribution
This marine species occurs off the Philippines.

References

 Bouchet P. & Sysoev A. (1997) Revision of the Recent species of Buccinaria (Gastropoda: Conoidea), a genus of deep-water turrids of Tethyan origin. Venus, Japanese Journal of Malacology, 56:93-119

External links
 MNHN, Paris: holotype

pendula
Gastropods described in 1997